(lit. 'Buddhist Art') is a bi-monthly academic journal of Buddhist art, particularly that of Japan. It is published in Japanese by Mainichi Shinbunsha.

See also
 Buddhist art in Japan

References

External links
 Books Mainichi listing
 CiNii Article Finder

Buddhist art
Buddhist studies journals
Japanese art
Architecture in Japan
Japanese studies
Japanese-language journals
Publications established in 1948